Makemake (also written as Make-make; pronounced  in Rapa Nui) in the Rapa Nui mythology of Easter Island, is the creator of humanity, the god of fertility and the chief god of the "Tangata manu" or bird-man sect (this sect succeeded the island's more famous Moai era). He appeared to be the local form, or name, of the old Polynesian god Tane. He had no wife.

Makemake, as a face with large eyes or perhaps a skull with large eye sockets and a phallic nose, is a frequent subject of the Rapa Nui petroglyphs.

The Birdman sect 
Métraux states that Easter Island's "greatest religious festival, the only one concerning which circumstantial details survive, was that of the bird-man, intimately linked with the cult of the god Makemake."

Makemake drove the birds to nest on the islet of Motu Nui ('big islet'), the center of the tangata-manu (bird-man) sect. Four gods were associated with it: Makemake, Haua-tuꞌu-take-take ('Chief of the eggs', usually simply called 'Haua'), vîꞌe Hoa (Haua's wife) and vîꞌe Kenatea. Each of the four gods had a supernatural servant, whose "names were given" in the ceremonies.

The ivi atua was the 'seer' who has the vision to select who swam to Motu Nui. A hopu was one of those who make the swim to the islet. Per Englert, the hopu manu were "those who served the tagata manu and, upon finding the first manutara egg, took it to Orongo [on the mainland]." 
The manu tara, or sooty tern, was the bird that the ceremony centred on; it was the first manu tara egg that was the goal of the ceremony.

Companions 
Makemake's principal companion was Haua. "The formula which accompanies an offering to Makemake always includes Haua who appears in the myth as the god's companion."

Makemake's offspring were Tive, Rorai, Hova and "the noblewoman Arangi-kote-kote".

In astronomy
The trans-Neptunian dwarf planet Makemake is so named because both the planet and the island are connected to Easter; the planet was discovered shortly after Easter 2005, and the first European contact with Easter Island was on Easter Sunday 1722. The dwarf planet's code name was "Easterbunny".

References

 Alfred Métraux. [1940] 1971. Ethnology of Easter Island. Bernice P. Bishop Museum Bulletin 160. Honolulu: Bishop Museum Press.
 Katherine Routledge The Mystery of Easter Island 1919

External link

Creator gods
Fertility gods
Polynesian gods
Mythological hybrids
Rapa Nui gods
Easter Island
Deity
Harvest gods